Fusee or fusée may refer to:
 Fusee (horology), a component of a clock
 Flare, a pyrotechnic device sometimes called a Fusee
 Fusee, an old word for "flintlock, rifle, particularly a light musket"

See also
 Fuser (disambiguation)